Na Krasaeng is a tambon (subdistrict) of Det Udom District, in Ubon Ratchathani Province, Thailand. In 2021, it had a population of 13,602 people. Neighbouring subdistricts are (clockwise from the south) Nong Om, Thung Thoeng, Khok Sawang, Na Charoen, and Som Sa-at.

History
The region was first settled in 1934 by five household villagers who evacuated from Khum village (บ้านคุ้ม) in Warin Chamrap district; a new village was unofficially called "Nong Khee Kwai" (หนองขี้ควาย; Cow dung pond's village), after the feature of the pond nearby. Later in 1945, the community size increased to 60–70 households, and the district government of Det Udom then renamed it "Na Krasaeng," after the runnel name formed in the area, as well as officially registering it as a new village under the control of Som Sa-at subdistrict. After that, the village was transferred to be a member of the Thung Thoeng subdistrict, then to Nong Om and Na Charoen, until it obtained subdistrict status in 1983.

Geography
The tambon is located in the southwestern region of the Det Udom district, on a plateau with a tropical savanna climate.

Administration
The tambon is divided into 13 administrative villages (mubans; หมู่บ้าน), one of which, Na Krasaeng village, was further divided into four community groups (Mu; หมู่). The entire area is governed by the Subdistrict Administrative Organization of Na Krasaeng (องค์การบริหารส่วนตำบลนากระแซง; Na Krasaeng SAO).

The following is a list of the subdistrict's mubans, which roughly correspond to the villages, as of the 2021 census.

References

Tambon of Ubon Ratchathani Province